Linwood is a small town in Renfrewshire in the west central Lowlands of Scotland,  west of Glasgow.

History
Linwood owes its existence to the building of cotton and flax mills there at the end of the 18th century. In the following century there were shale coal oil works, ironstone and cotton production businesses in the village. There was a bleachfield at Linwood connected to the spinning mill there. A paper mill was also established as can be seen on older maps. The expansion and economy of Linwood from 1961 onwards relied heavily on the Rootes, later Chrysler then Peugeot Talbot car plant, and the associated Pressed Steel Company body parts pressing facility.

Construction at the car factory began in 1961 to produce the Hillman Imp, a revolutionary small car which went into production when the factory was opened on 2 May 1963, and was not discontinued until 1976. The factory, opened by the Duke of Edinburgh, had the advantage of a direct rail link, which allowed cars to be transported by rail to places all over Britain. The opening and production can be seen in the Rootes Group's 20-minute film. It later produced the Hillman Avenger (later badged as a Chrysler and finally a Talbot) from 1970 and the Imp's successor, the Sunbeam.

After Chrysler UK was bought by Peugeot Talbot, a review of the plant and associated models decided to close the Linwood plant in favour of retaining the Ryton plant near Coventry. Linwood was closed in 1981 with most of the factory demolished soon afterwards. The final remaining part was demolished in 1996.

The closure left mass unemployment. The state of the town was immortalised in the song "Letter from America" by The Proclaimers; the lyrics "Linwood no more" referred to the closure of the car factory.

On 10 August 2006, a local community action group, Linwood Sucks, initiated what became a six-year campaign to expose various problems with contaminated land in the area and to highlight the decline of the original town centre. Despite the negative overtones of their name, the group along with qualified collaborators and community support, conducted a great deal of technical research which contributed to a variety of positive changes in the town. One of the initial objectives included research into the lack of playground facilities for the local children. This objective was carried on successfully by Linwood Active, another group, who would later attain charitable status and redevelop the playground facility at Kintyre Park.

In December 2011, Linwood received the annual "Plook on the Plinth" award for "Scotland's most dismal town", part of the Urban Realm magazine's 'Carbuncle Awards'. The magazine suggests that the award is intended to cause debate and inspire redevelopment.

The Linwood Community Development Trust was formed on 7 December 2011.

In 2014, Paul Coulter's play Linwood No More was performed at the Tron Theatre in Glasgow.  Linwood, and the closure of the car factory, were also the inspiration for the title track of the 2015 Simon Kempston album, The Last Car.

UEFA Champions League winner Paul Lambert, grew up in Linwood. Former Dundee United F.C. captain, Paul Paton, is also from Linwood. Ex goalkeeper Billy Thomson grew up in Linwood.

Present

Linwood has undergone a major redevelopment which began in 2008:
 Four schools have been rebuilt or refurbished
 New housing stock - private and social -  
 £24 million sports centre - home to several sports clubs
 Tesco town centre regeneration 
 Community care home
 Kintyre Park playground facilities

Economy
Linwood is the  HQ of the transport and construction company W H Malcolm and was the HQ of Beeks Financial Cloud Group Plc a low latency service provider for institutional capital markets, listed on the AIM market.

Education
The town has the following educational establishments:

Nursery
 East Fulton 
 Our Lady of Peace
 Linwood community childcare

Primary Schools
 East Fulton 
 Our Lady of Peace
 Woodlands

Secondary Schools
 Linwood High 
 St Benedict's RC High

Special Education
 Linwood's Riverbrae School (a special education school) opened in August 2017, it replaced Clippens (formerly Mossedge Primary), the Hollybush Pre-5 Centre and Kersland Schools.

Transport
Linwood is on the A761 close to its junction with the A737 which links the town to Glasgow Airport and the motorway network to the east, and Garnock Valley and the North Ayrshire coast to the south-west.

Local transport is served by McGill's Bus Services who have several services that link the town to the nearby towns of Johnstone, Bridge of Weir, Houston and Paisley, and it also has services which connect the town to Braehead and Glasgow.

Rail transport can be accessed from the nearby Johnstone railway station, which includes a two level park and ride car park. This route provides services westwards to Ayr, Troon, Stranraer, Irvine, Kilwinning, Largs, Ardrossan and Lochwinnoch and eastwards to Paisley, Hillington, Cardonald and Glasgow Central.

References

Rootes Group
Towns in Renfrewshire
Greater Glasgow